This is a list of the National Register of Historic Places listings in Aransas County, Texas.

This is intended to be a complete list of properties and districts listed on the National Register of Historic Places in Aransas County, Texas. There are one district and four individual properties listed on the National Register in the county. Three individually listed properties are Recorded Texas Historic Landmarks including one that is also a State Historic Site and a State Antiquities Landmark.

Current listings

The publicly disclosed locations of National Register properties may be seen in a mapping service provided.

|}

See also

National Register of Historic Places listings in Texas
Recorded Texas Historic Landmarks in Aransas County

References

External links

Aransas County, Texas
Aransas County
Buildings and structures in Aransas County, Texas